The N84 road is a national secondary road in Ireland. It is a major route in the West connecting Galway city with Castlebar. The route is of poor quality with a few short good sections in County Mayo between Ballintubber and Ballinrobe. Ballinrobe has become a bottleneck on the route in recent years with up to 8,000 vehicles passing through the town's one-way streets. A bypass for the town is in the planning.

Route
Galway – Cloonboo – Headford – Shrule – Kilmaine – Ballinrobe – Partry – Castlebar

See also
Roads in Ireland 
Motorways in Ireland
National primary road
Regional road

References
Roads Act 1993 (Classification of National Roads) Order 2006 – Department of Transport

National secondary roads in the Republic of Ireland
Roads in County Galway
Roads in County Mayo